November 13 - Eastern Orthodox liturgical calendar - November 15

All fixed commemorations below celebrated on November 27 by Orthodox Churches on the Old Calendar.

For November 14th, Orthodox Churches on the Old Calendar commemorate the Saints listed on November 1.

Saints
 Holy and All-Praised Apostle Philip (c. 81-96)
 Saint Stachys, Bishop of Hierapolis (in Phrygia) (1st century)
 Saint Justinian the Emperor (565) and his wife St. Theodora (548)  (see also: November 15)
 Saint Thomas II of Constantinople, Patriarch of Constantinople (665-668)  (see also: November 15 )
 Virgin Martyrs of Emesa, Syria (779)

Pre-Schism Western saints
 Saint Veneranda (Venera), an early martyr in France (2nd century) 
 Saint Venerandus, an influential citizen of Troyes in France martyred under Aurelian (275) 
 Saint Jucundus of Bologna, Bishop of Bologna in Italy (485) 
 Saint Dubricius (Dubric, Dyfrig), Bishop in Hereford and Gwent, hermit, of Bardsey Island (c. 545)
 Saint Sidonius of Saint-Saëns, a monk at Jumièges Abbey, later the first abbot of Saint-Säens (c. 690)
 Saint Malo of Brittany (7th century)  (see also: November 15)
 Saint Alberic of Utrecht, Bishop of Utrecht (784)
 Saint Modanic, a bishop in Scotland (8th century)

Post-Schism Orthodox saints
 Saint Euphemianos the Wonderworker, of Cyprus (12th century)
 Saint Gregory Palamas the Wonderworker, Archbishop of Thessaloniki (1360)
 Saint Philip, founder of Irap Monastery, Novgorod (1527)
 New Martyr Constantine of Hydra, at Rhodes (1800)
 New Martyr Panteleimon the Youth, of Spetses, in Crete (1848)

New martyrs and confessors
 New Hieromartyrs (1937):
 Priests: Demetrius Benevolensky; Alexander Bykov; Victor Ilyinsky; Alexis Nechayev; Michael Belyustin; Michael Nekrasov; Theodore Bakkalinsky; Peter Titov; Alexis Nikologorsky; Sergius Znamensky; Nicholas Dunayev; Basil Likharev; Alexander Pokrovsky; Nicholas Vinogradov; Demetrius Lebedev; Porphirius Kolosovsky; Basil Nikolsky; George Izvekov; Basil Rozanov; Sergius Spassky; Alexander Chekalov; Sergius Rufitsky; 
 Nicholas Bogorodsky, Deacon; 
 Aristarchus (Zaglodin-Kokorev), Hieromonk of St. Nicholas Peshnosha Monastery, Moscow.
 Martyr Gabriel Bezfamilnov; 
 Martyr Demetrius Rudakov;
 Virgin-martyr Anna Zertsalova.
 New Hieromartyr Theodore Grudakov, Priest (1940)
 New Hieromartyr Sergius Konstantinov, Priest (1941)

Other commemorations
 Repose of St. Alexander Nevsky (Alexis in schema), Great Prince of Novgorod (1263)
 Repose of Archimandrite Lazarus (Moore) of Eagle River, Alaska (1992).

Icon gallery

Notes

References

Sources
 November 14/November 27. Orthodox Calendar (PRAVOSLAVIE.RU).
 November 27 / November 14. HOLY TRINITY RUSSIAN ORTHODOX CHURCH (A parish of the Patriarchate of Moscow).
 November 14. OCA - The Lives of the Saints.
 The Autonomous Orthodox Metropolia of Western Europe and the Americas (ROCOR). St. Hilarion Calendar of Saints for the year of our Lord 2004. St. Hilarion Press (Austin, TX). p. 85.
 The Fourteenth Day of the Month of November. Orthodoxy in China.
 November 14. Latin Saints of the Orthodox Patriarchate of Rome.
 The Roman Martyrology. Transl. by the Archbishop of Baltimore. Last Edition, According to the Copy Printed at Rome in 1914. Revised Edition, with the Imprimatur of His Eminence Cardinal Gibbons. Baltimore: John Murphy Company, 1916. pp. 351–352.
 Rev. Richard Stanton. A Menology of England and Wales, or, Brief Memorials of the Ancient British and English Saints Arranged According to the Calendar, Together with the Martyrs of the 16th and 17th Centuries. London: Burns & Oates, 1892. pp. 538–542.
Greek Sources
 Great Synaxaristes:  14 ΝΟΕΜΒΡΙΟΥ. ΜΕΓΑΣ ΣΥΝΑΞΑΡΙΣΤΗΣ.
  Συναξαριστής. 14 Νοεμβρίου. ECCLESIA.GR. (H ΕΚΚΛΗΣΙΑ ΤΗΣ ΕΛΛΑΔΟΣ).
  14/11/2016. Ορθόδοξος Συναξαριστής. 
Russian Sources
  27 ноября (14 ноября). Православная Энциклопедия под редакцией Патриарха Московского и всея Руси Кирилла (электронная версия). (Orthodox Encyclopedia - Pravenc.ru).
  14 ноября по старому стилю  /  27 ноября по новому стилю. Русская Православная Церковь - Православный церковный календарь на 2016 год.

November in the Eastern Orthodox calendar